Mohammed Akensus (also Akensous) or Abu Abdallah Mohammed ben Ahmad Akensus al-Marrakushi (1797, (Sous) - 1877) was a well-known Moroccan historian  and a minister under Mulay Slimane and moulay Abd al-Rahman. He is from the Berber tribe of Ida u-Kansus which inhabited the Sous region in southern Morocco.

He wrote on the reign of moulay Mohammed ben Abdallah and is the author of  Al-Djaish al-aramram (The Great Army), lith. Fas (1918).

References

Abdelkader Zammama, Al-Waziran ac-cahiban: Ibn Idris wa-Akansus (Les deuz vizirs amis: Ibn Idris et Akensous), Dawat al-Haqq, March 1969

1797 births
1877 deaths
19th-century Moroccan historians
Berber historians
People from Souss-Massa
Shilha people